The Diocese of Borgå is a diocese for the Swedish-speaking minority of Finland. It is a part of the Evangelical Lutheran Church of Finland. Porvoo (Borgå in Swedish) is also the old seat of the present-day (Finnish-speaking) Diocese of Tampere.

Unlike the other dioceses of the Evangelical Lutheran Church of Finland, the diocese is not formed on a geographical basis. All the Swedish-speaking parishes and dominantly Swedish-speaking bilingual parishes of the church belong to the diocese, regardless of their location. As a result of the geographical distribution of Swedish-speakers, the parishes of the diocese are mostly on the coast, the Swedish-speaking parish of Tampere being the only inland parish. In addition, there are two ethnicity-based parishes in the diocese: The German parish of Finland and rikssvenska Olaus Petri församlingen, the former Church of Sweden parish in Finland. The German parish is the parish for the German-speaking minority of Finland, while the rikssvenska parish consists of Swedish citizens living in Finland.

The diocese has some 234,000 parishioners.

Bishops of Borgå
 Max von Bonsdorff, 1923–1954
 Georg Olof Rosenqvist, 1954–1961
 Karl-Erik Forssell, 1961–1970
 John Vikström, 1970–1982
 Erik Vikström, 1983–2006
 Gustav Björkstrand, 2006–2009
 Björn Vikström 2009–2019
 Bo-Göran Åstrand 2019–

Two of the three bishops Vikström are brothers, John (later archbishop of Turku/Åbo) and Erik, while Björn is a son of John Vikström.

See also
 Porvoo Cathedral

Christian organizations established in 1923
Lutheran districts established in the 20th century
Borga